Jenny Campbell (born 1961) is a former British banker and panelist on Dragons' Den.

Jenny Campbell may also refer to:

 Jenny Campbell (artist) (1895–1970), Scottish-born New Zealand artist
 Jenny Campbell, cartoonist who writes Flo & Friends
 Jenny Campbell (environmentalist), New Zealand environmentalist